Baza PMS-113 is a railway station near Vologda, Russia. It is located on the Northern Railway.

References 

Railway stations in Vologda Oblast